Justus Hermanni Annunen (born 11 March 2000) is a Finnish professional ice hockey goaltender for the Colorado Eagles of the American Hockey League (AHL) as a prospect to the Colorado Avalanche of the National Hockey League (NHL). Annunen won the Stanley Cup while serving as the Avalanche's backup goaltender for portions of the 2022 Stanley Cup playoffs.

Playing career

Finland
Annunen first played as a 14-year old with Kiekko-Laser at the junior under-18 level in 2014. Showing promise at age 16, Annunen joined the ranks of Oulun Kärpät, leading the under-18 team in the 2016–17 season, with 30 appearances. In the 2017–18 season, Annunen played predominantly in the Nuorten SM-liiga, posting a 2.21 goals-against average and .907 save percentage. He made his professional and Liiga debut with Kärpät near the conclusion of the regular season, allowing four goals in 33 shots of a shutout defeat to HPK on 8 March 2018. He returned to the Jr. A to be named as the league's best goalie, a first-team all-star and won a silver medal after the club finished in second place.

With his draft eligible status, Annunen was ranked as the fourth International goalie by the NHL Central Scouting Bureau and was elevated as the third keeper selected, when he was drafted in the third-round, 64th overall, by the Colorado Avalanche in the 2018 NHL Entry Draft.

In order to continue his development, Annunen was loaned by Kärpät to Mestis club Kokkolan Hermes, to begin the 2018–19 season on 31 July 2018. In 22 appearances with Hermes, he had a 12–7–2 record with a 2.77 goals-against average and .891 save percentage, before he returned to Kärpät mirroring his previous season in making one regular season appearance in a 4–3 overtime defeat to KalPa on 14 March 2019. In the post-season, Annunen was assigned to join Kärpät's Junior team and posted a 1.50 goals-against average and .930 save percentage in six appearances to help the team capture the Jr. A SM-liiga championship.

In the 2019–20 season, Annunen was slated to play in the Liiga to serve as the backup to Patrik Rybár. He collected his first Liiga win in a 3–2 decision in his opening game against KalPa on 12 September 2019. On 16 September 2019, Annunen was signed to an improved two-year contract extension to solidify his role in the Liiga. From September 21 to October 23, Annunen collected four consecutive shutouts to establish a new league record for the longest shutout streak during a single season (302 minutes, five seconds). Sharing the goaltending duties with Rybár for the regular season leading Kärpät, Annunen posted a 15–5–3 record in 23 games, ranking first among all goaltenders in both save percentage (.929) and goals-against average (1.77). With the season ended prematurely before the commencement of the playoffs due to the COVID-19 pandemic, Annunen finished the season third in voting for the Urpo Ylönen trophy as the league's best goalkeeper.

Colorado Avalanche
On 30 April 2020, Annunen was signed by his draft club, the Colorado Avalanche, to a three-year, entry-level contract. He was assigned to continue his development and tenure with Oulun Kärpät for the 2020–21 season. Unable to match his previous seasons numbers, Annunen played in a career high 24 regular season games, collecting seven wins and recording a 2.43 goals-against average and a .880 save percentage. He lost both playoff games as seventh-seeded Oulun Kärpät bowed out of the post-season after a quarterfinal defeat to HIFK. On 6 May 2021, Annunen was reassigned by the Avalanche to begin his North American career with AHL affiliate, the Colorado Eagles, for the remainder of their season.

Annunen continued with the Eagles to begin the following 2021–22 season, assigned by the Avalanche to assume the starting goaltender role. Adapting to the North American rink and style, Annunen was winless in his first 8 career AHL contests before earning a 5–4 overtime victory against the San Jose Barracuda on 29 October 2021. He quickly improved to collect the AHL's November Goaltender of the Month honors in posting a 5–1–2 record. On 1 December, Annunen received his first NHL recall on emergency conditions, after starting goaltender Darcy Kuemper went down with injury. He joined the Avalanche in time for the second period, assuming the backup duties for the remainder of an 8–2 defeat to the Toronto Maple Leafs. Continuing as backup with the Avalanche on their Canadian road trip, on 4 December 2021, Annunen made his NHL debut with the Avalanche, appearing in relief of goaltender Jonas Johansson and allowing two goals on 19 shots including the overtime winner of a 6–5 defeat by the Ottawa Senators. Annunen achieved his first NHL win on 6 December when the Avalanche defeated the Philadelphia Flyers 7–5.

Annunen was called up by the Avalanche during the 2022 Stanley Cup playoffs dressing for 13 May after an eye injury to Darcy Kuemper. Annunen dress for two games in the Western Conference Finals when Kuemper had an upper body injury. However, he did not play in a game. He shared in the team's eventual Stanley Cup win. He was given a Stanley Cup ring but did not dress in the finals. So his name was not put on the Cup.

International play

Annunen first represented Finland at the 2017 Ivan Hlinka Memorial Tournament before competing at the 2018 IIHF World U18 Championships, the latter of which he helped Finland to a gold medal. He posted a 2.00 goals-against average and .914 save percentage in six games at the under-18 tournament.

Annunen represented his country at the 2020 World Junior Championships, where he finished the tournament with a .916 save percentage and a 2.65 goals-against average in six contests. His 362:01 minutes in net was the second-most among all goaltenders in the tournament.

Career statistics

Regular season and playoffs

International

Awards and honours

References

External links
 

2000 births
Living people
Colorado Avalanche draft picks
Colorado Avalanche players
Colorado Eagles players
Finnish ice hockey goaltenders
Ice hockey players at the 2016 Winter Youth Olympics
Kokkolan Hermes players
Oulun Kärpät players
People from Kempele
Sportspeople from North Ostrobothnia